Neues Museum Nürnberg (NMN) is a museum for modern and contemporary art and design in Nuremberg.

Architecture 
In 1990 the Bavarian government decided to build a 20th-century museum.

The building in which the museum is located was designed by the architect Volker Staab. Construction started on 11 September 1996 and ended in October 1999. The official opening was on 15. April 2000. On 3000 sq/m contemporary art as well as art and design dating back to the 1950s is being shown.

Environmental Protection 
Since March 2015, the NMN houses bees on its roof. City beekeeper Bernd J. Kobr currently looks after the bees. Their honey "Stadtgold" ("City Gold") can be bought in the museum shop.

Directors 

 Lucius Grisebach from 1. October 1997 to 31. August 2007
 Angelika Nollert from 1. October 2007 to 1. May 2014
 Eva-Christina Kraus from 1. September 2014 to 31. July 2020
Simone Schimpf since 1. July 2021

References

External links
  Museum website 

Modern art museums in Germany
Art museums and galleries in Germany
Art museums established in 2000
Museums in Nuremberg
2000 establishments in Germany